The West Siberian petroleum basin (also known as the West Siberian hydrocarbon province or Western Siberian oil basin) is the largest hydrocarbon (petroleum and natural gas) basin in the world covering an area of about 2.2 million km², and is also the largest oil and gas producing region in Russia.

Geographically it corresponds to the West Siberian plain. From continental West Siberia, it extends into the Kara Sea as the East-Prinovozemelsky field.

Beneath lie remnants of the Siberian traps, thought to be responsible for the Great Dying 250 million years ago.

History

Gas was discovered in 1953 in Upper Jurassic sandstones and limestones, within the Berezov Field.  Then in 1960, oil was discovered in the Upper Jurassic 400 km south, in the Trekhozer Field.  A Neocomian oil discovery followed in 1961, in the Middle Ob Region, followed by several giant and large fields, including the Samotlor Field.  Gas was discovered in Cenomanian sandstones in 1962 within the Taz Field.  This was followed by several giant and large dry gas fields in the Aptian-Cenomanian Pokur Formation, including the Medvezhye Field and Urengoy Field, which commenced production in 1972 and 1978 respectively. Lower-Middle Jurassic discoveries were made in the Tyumen Formation in the 1970s, within the Krasnolenin Arch, including the Talin Field in 1976.  The giant Rusanovskoye Field and Leningrad Field were discovered in the south Kara Sea in 1989-90.

Since the early 2010s Russia's state-owned energy company Gazprom has been developing Yamal project in the Yamal Peninsula area. As of 2020, Yamal produces over 20% of Russia's gas, which is expected to increase to 40% by 2030. The shortest pipeline routes from Yamal to the northern EU countries are the Yamal–Europe pipeline through Poland and Nord Stream 1 to Germany. The proposed gas route from Western Siberia to China is known as Power of Siberia 2 pipeline.

Description

Geography

The basin occupies a swampy plain between the Ural Mountains
and the Yenisey River. On the north, the basin extends offshore
into the southern Kara Sea. On the west, north, and east, the
basin is surrounded by the Ural, Yenisey Ridge, and Turukhan-
Igarka foldbelts that experienced major deformations during the
Hercynian tectonic event and the Novaya Zemlya foldbelt that
was deformed in early Cimmerian (Triassic) time. On the south,
the folded Caledonian structures of the Central Kazakhstan and
Altay-Sayan regions dip northward beneath the basin’s sedimentary
cover.

Geology
The basin is a relatively undeformed Mesozoic sag
that overlies the Hercynian accreted terrane and the Early Triassic
rift system. The basement is composed of foldbelts that were
deformed in Late Carboniferous–Permian time during collision
of the Siberian and Kazakhstan continents with the Russian craton.
The basement also includes several microcontinental blocks
with a relatively undeformed Paleozoic sedimentary sequence.

The sedimentary succession of the basin is composed of
Middle Triassic through Tertiary clastic rocks. The lower part of
this succession is present only in the northern part of the basin;
southward, progressively younger strata onlap the basement, so
that in the southern areas the basement is overlain by Toarcian
and younger rocks. The important stage in tectono-stratigraphic
development of the basin was formation of a deep-water sea in
Volgian–early Berriasian time. The sea covered more than one million km
2 in the central basin area. Highly organic-rich
siliceous shales of the Bazhenov Formation were deposited
during this time in anoxic conditions on the sea bottom. Rocks
of this formation have generated more than 80 percent of West
Siberian oil reserves and probably a substantial part of its gas
reserves. The deep-water basin was filled by prograding clastic
clinoforms during Neocomian time. The clastic material was
transported by a system of rivers dominantly from the eastern
provenance. Sandstones within the Neocomian clinoforms contain
the principal oil reservoirs. The thick continental Aptian–
Cenomanian Pokur Formation above the Neocomian sequence
contains giant gas reserves in the northern part of the basin.

Oil and gas reserves

The Western Siberian oil basin is the largest oil and gas producing region in Russia. The oil extracted in this territory accounts 70% of the oil produced in the country.

Three total petroleum systems are identified in the West
Siberian basin. Volumes of discovered hydrocarbons in these
systems are 144 billion barrels of oil and more than 1,300
trillion cubic feet of gas. The assessed mean undiscovered
resources are 55.2 billion barrels of oil, 642.9 trillion cubic feet
of gas, and 20.5 billion barrels of natural gas liquids.

The largest known oil reserves are in the Bazhenov-Neocomian Total Petroleum
System that includes Upper Jurassic and younger rocks
of the central and southern parts of the basin. Oil reservoirs are
mainly in Neocomian and Upper Jurassic clastic strata. Source
rocks are organic-rich siliceous shales of the Bazhenov Formation.
Most discovered reserves are in structural traps, but stratigraphic
traps in the Neocomian clinoform sequence are productive
and are expected to contain much of the undiscovered
resources. Two assessment units are identified in this total petroleum
system. The first assessment unit includes all conventional
reservoirs in the stratigraphic interval from the Upper Jurassic to
the Cenomanian. The second unit includes unconventional (or
continuous), self-sourced, fractured reservoirs in the Bazhenov
Formation. This unit was not assessed quantitatively.

The Togur-Tyumen Total Petroleum System covers the
same geographic area as the Bazhenov-Neocomian system, but
it includes older, Lower–Middle Jurassic strata and weathered
rocks at the top of the pre-Jurassic sequence. A Callovian
regional shale seal of the Abalak and lower Vasyugan Formations
separates the two systems. The Togur-Tyumen system is
oil-prone; gas reserves are insignificant. The principal oil
reserves are in sandstone reservoirs at the top and bottom of the
Lower–Middle Jurassic Tyumen Formation; comparatively
small reserves are in pre-Jurassic carbonate and clastic rocks.
The principal source rocks are lacustrine to marine shales of the
Toarcian Togur Bed. Traps are structural, stratigraphic, or a
combination of the two. The total petroleum system was assessed
as a single assessment unit. Most of the undiscovered
resources are expected in stratigraphic and combination traps.

The northern onshore and offshore parts of the basin are
included in the Northern West Siberian Mesozoic Composite
Total Petroleum System that encompasses the entire sedimentary
cover. The system is strongly gas-prone; it contains giant
gas reserves and comparatively small oil reserves. The major
part of hydrocarbon reserves is dry gas in the upper Aptian–Cenomanian
sandstones (Pokur Formation and equivalents). Smaller
reserves of wet gas and some oil are in Jurassic and Neocomian
sandstones. Source rocks for the dry gas in the Pokur Formation
that constitutes more than 80 percent of the hydrocarbon
reserves are unknown. Wet Neocomian gas and oil were generated
from Jurassic source rocks, including the Bazhenov Formation.

Almost all discovered reserves are in structural traps;
however, stratigraphic traps in the Neocomian interval probably
contain large undiscovered gas resources. The onshore and offshore
parts of the total petroleum system were assessed as separate
units because of different exploration maturity and different
infrastructure requirements. The onshore area is substantially
explored, especially in the shallow Aptian–Cenomanian
sequence, whereas only three exploratory wells have been drilled
offshore. Undiscovered gas potential of both assessment units is
very high.

See also

 Kara Sea
 Priobskoye field
 Salym Petroleum Development
 Samotlor Field
 Tunguska Basin
 Yamburg gas field

References

Geography of Siberia
Industry in the Arctic
Natural gas fields in Russia
Oil fields of Russia
Oil fields of the Soviet Union